Lakshmipur Science & Technology University is a government financed public university of Bangladesh.

History 
In 2017, at a public rally in Lakshmipur District Stadium Sheikh Hasina, The Prime Minister of Bangladesh announced that, "We build a Science & Technology University in Lakshmipur."

Then, after three years, Cabinet Ministry approves "Lakshmipur Science & Technology University Bill - 2020".

List of vice-chancellors 

 VC ( joining date )

References

External links 
 University Grants Commission of Bangladesh
 Bangladesh Bureau of Educational Information and Statistics

Public engineering universities of Bangladesh
Public universities of Bangladesh